Shahnameh of Rashidā is an illustrated manuscript of the Shahnameh, the national epic of Greater Iran. It contains 738 pages with 93 miniatures in Isfahan School. The miniatures have been attributed to Mohammad Yusef, a Safavid-era painter. This manuscript dates  from the 17th century and now it is located in the Golestan Palace. The calligraphy of this manuscript has been attributed to ʿAbd al-Rashid Daylami and for this reason, it is called the "Rashida Shahnameh".

The miniatures of this Shahnameh are very similar to the miniatures of the Windsor Shahnameh so it has been suggested that these manuscripts have been prepared by the same painters.

References 

Manuscripts of Shahnameh
Safavid Iran